Siegfred Karl Kast (c. 1916 – 1 December 1955) was a German immigrant to Australia who shot dead two doctors and unsuccessfully attempted to detonate a bomb in Wickham Terrace, Brisbane, before committing suicide.

Incident 
On Thursday, 1 December 1955, Karl Kast, carrying a home-made bomb shot dead two doctors, Dr Arthur Vincent Meehan and Dr Andrew R Murray and wounded Dr Michael Joseph Gallagher and George Boland.  A fifth person, Dr John Lahz was severely traumatised due to the incident.  Dr Michael Gallagher, Kast's first victim, was shot in his offices in Wickham House.  Kast then ignited three bombs in the foyer of the building.  George Boland, a patient of one of the doctors in the building, attempted to stub out the bomb only to have it explode and maim his hand.  Kast then went to Ballow Chambers, around hundred metres down Wickham Terrace, where he shot Dr Andrew R Murray and attempted to apprehend Dr John Lahz, who escaped.

Following his rampage, Kast locked himself in the office of Dr Lahz, within Ballow Chambers, where he shot himself and ignited another bomb.  He later died in hospital.

Aftermath
A brown paper parcel was delivered to the Brisbane Criminal Investigation Branch containing a letter from Kast claiming that he "did not receive justice elsewhere" and listing his four victims by name. The parcel also contained correspondence detailing his attempts to receive compensation for an alleged back injury.

The tragedy was reported in the Courier-Mail on Friday, 2 December, as "...a horrible crime ...[that]...sent a shock of horror through the city and all Queensland". Kast was buried in an unmarked grave at Toowong Cemetery.

References

Terrorism in Australia
Murder in Queensland
Burials at Toowong Cemetery
German emigrants to Australia
1955 deaths
Bombers (people)
Year of birth uncertain
1955 murders in Australia
Australian spree killers
Murder in Brisbane
1950s mass shootings
20th-century mass shootings in Australia
Suicides by firearm in Australia